The 2009 Nationals was the 39th Men's Elite and Women's Nationals.  The Nationals was a team handball tournament to determined the National Champion from 2019 from the US.

Final ranking
Source:

Men's Elite ranking

Women's Open ranking

References

USA Team Handball Nationals by year